Helton Samo Cunha (born 19 May 1980), nicknamed Tó, is a Mozambican former footballer who mostly played as a striker for Costa do Sol.

Born in Beira, Tó began his senior career in 1996 with Têxtil do Punguè and he also played in South Africa for Jomo Cosmos.

External links 

1980 births
Living people
Mozambican footballers
Mozambique international footballers
Association football forwards
GD da Companhia Têxtil do Punguè players
CD Costa do Sol players
Jomo Cosmos F.C. players
Moçambola players
South African Premier Division players
Mozambican expatriate footballers
Expatriate soccer players in South Africa
Mozambican expatriate sportspeople in South Africa
People from Beira, Mozambique